The 2001 Florida State Seminoles football team represented Florida State University during the 2001 NCAA Division I-A football season. The team was coached by Bobby Bowden and played their home games at Doak Campbell Stadium. They were members of the Atlantic Coast Conference (ACC).

Schedule

Roster

Game summaries

Miami (FL)

Virginia

Maryland

NC State

Gator Bowl

References

Florida State
Florida State Seminoles football seasons
Gator Bowl champion seasons
Florida State Seminoles football